"I Shall Not Be Moved", also known as "We Shall Not Be Moved",  is an African-American slave spiritual, hymn, and protest song dating to the early 19th century American south. It was likely originally sung at revivalist camp-meetings as a slave jubilee. The song describes being "like a tree planted by the waters" who "shall not be moved" because of faith in God. Secularly, as "We Shall Not Be Moved" it gained popularity as a protest and union song of the Civil Rights Movement.

The text is based on biblical scripture:

In 1908 Alfred H. and B. D. Ackley copyrighted a hymn by the name "I Shall Not Be Moved".

Civil rights movement
As "We Shall Not Be Moved" the song gained popularity as a protest and union song of the Civil rights movement.

The song became popular in the Swedish anti-nuclear and peace movements in the late 1970s, in a Swedish translation by Roland von Malmborg, "" ('Never shall we give up').

Recorded versions

Among others, the following artists recorded "I (We) Shall Not Be Moved":
 Blind Roosevelt Graves (1929) – reissued on The Stuff That Dreams Are Made Of (2006)
 Charley Patton (1929)
 The Almanac Singers  with Pete Seeger on The Original Talking Union and Other Union Songs (1955)
 Lonnie Donegan on Lonnie Donegan Showcase (1956)
 The Million Dollar Quartet (Elvis Presley, Jerry Lee Lewis, Carl Perkins, and Johnny Cash) (1956)
 The Freedom Singers at the March on Washington (1963) in a medley with other songs
 Mississippi John Hurt on The Best Of Mississippi John Hurt (recorded 1965, published 1970)
 Ella Fitzgerald on Brighten the Corner (1967)
 Oktoberklub on Der Oktober-Klub singt (1967)
 The Seekers, on several albums including The Best of The Seekers (1968)
 Son House on The Real Delta Blues – 14 songs from the man who taught Robert Johnson (recorded 1960, published 1974)
 Joan Baez ("No Nos Moverán") on her Spanish-language album Gracias a la Vida (1974)
 Henry Qualls on Blues from Elmo, Texas (1994)
 Underground Ministries featuring Kenny Bobien (Vinyl, 12", Single, Promo) (1999)
 Sweet Honey in the Rock on Still the Same Me (2000)
 This Bike Is a Pipe Bomb on Front Seat Solidarity (2002)
 Peter, Paul and Mary on In These Times (2003)
 Johnny Cash on My Mother's Hymn Book (2004)
 Mavis Staples on We'll Never Turn Back (2007)
 Public Enemy on Most of My Heroes Still Don't Appear on No Stamp (2012)
 Owen McDonagh & The Bogside Men on Songs of Irish Civil Rights (1970)
Rhiannon Giddens on They're Calling Me Home (2021)
Taj Mahal and Ry Cooder on GET ON BOARD

The Housemartins on the 12 inch version of their 1985 UK number 1 single "Caravan of Love"

In popular culture

The Spinners set the musical tone of the 1975 Thames Television comedy about a Liverpool working-class family, The Wackers. The closing credits medley featured them singing "We Shall Not Be Moved" and "You'll Never Walk Alone".

In Great Britain in the 1980s the song was used by the popular British wrestler Big Daddy as his walk-on music, which would be greeted by cheers from the fans.

David Spener has written a book documenting the history of this song title, including how it was translated into Spanish, changing the first singular to third person plural, "" (meaning "They will not move us"). That version was part of the soundtrack of the well-known popular tv series Verano azul, which popularized the song among the Spanish youth.

JB Burnett covered the song for the first episode of the third season of Supernatural ("The Magnificent Seven").

Playwright Isaiah Reaves used the name for his show describing his grandmother's experiences as a Freedom Rider.

See also 
Civil rights movement in popular culture
Christian child's prayer § Spirituals

References

Gospel songs
African-American spiritual songs
Songs of the civil rights movement